Charles T. Hilsey  (1864–1918) was a Major League Baseball pitcher. After playing in the Majors in 1883 and 1884 he played in the minor leagues in 1885 and 1887.

External links
Baseball Reference.com page

1864 births
1918 deaths
Philadelphia Quakers players
Philadelphia Athletics (AA) players
Major League Baseball pitchers
Baseball players from Pennsylvania
Portland (minor league baseball) players
Shamokin Maroons players
Oswego Starchboxes players
Ashland (minor league baseball) players
Camden (minor league baseball) players
Lancaster (minor league baseball) players
19th-century baseball players